The Church of the Holy Archangels, also known as the Greeks' Church (Biserica grecilor), is a Romanian Orthodox church located at 3 Mitropolit Ioan Vancea Street in the Transylvanian city of Blaj. Until 1948 the church was Romanian Greek-Catholic.

The church is situated close to the bridge that crosses the Târnava Mare River. Built around 1770, it stands on the site of a previous wooden church. Construction was undertaken by local residents, who included Aromanian merchants erroneously described as "Greeks", giving rise to the nickname. The iconostasis, artistically sculpted in 1776, was later painted in Brâncovenesc style, as the initial art was destroyed.

This ensemble was praised by Nicolae Iorga. Additionally, it was linked by a 1969 article with Ștefan of Ocnele Mari, a painter hired in 1737 by Inocențiu Micu-Klein, head of the Romanian Greek-Catholic Church, headquartered in Blaj. As the Holy Trinity Cathedral was not even in the planning stages at that point and the old Greek church was the only Romanian church in Blaj at the time, the author concluded that Ștefan had painted the iconostasis. However, a 1977 article claimed that the style was far from belonging to a Wallachian painter of the first half of the 18th century, and that all the icons were painted in 1776.

The church cemetery includes the graves of a number of cultural and religious figures, most of whom were Greek-Catholic. Both the church and the cemetery are listed as historic monuments by Romania's Ministry of Culture.

Notes

References
Ana Dumitran, Simon Bălgrădeanul. Alba Iulia: Editura Altip, 2009, 

Blaj
Historic monuments in Alba County
Romanian Orthodox churches in Romania
Former Greek-Catholic churches in Romania
Churches completed in 1770
1770 establishments in the Habsburg monarchy
18th-century establishments in Hungary